Mount Cowart is a peak in Antarctica,  high, midway along Gale Ridge in the Neptune Range of the Pensacola Mountains. It was mapped by the United States Geological Survey from surveys and air photos, 1956–66, and named by the Advisory Committee on Antarctic Names for Master Sergeant Ray J. Cowart of the United States Air Force, a flight engineer and member of the Electronic Test Unit in the Pensacola Mountains during the summer of 1957–58.

References
 

Mountains of Queen Elizabeth Land
Pensacola Mountains